The Great Western Railway (GWR) 6000 Class or King Class is a class of 4-6-0 steam locomotives designed for express passenger work and introduced in 1927. They were the largest locomotives built by the GWR, apart from the unique Pacific (The Great Bear). The class was named after kings of the United Kingdom and of England, beginning with the then reigning monarch, King George V, and going back through history. They handled the principal GWR expresses on the main line from London to the West of England and on the Chiltern line to Birmingham and Wolverhampton, until 1962 when the class was withdrawn.

Background and development 

By 1918, it was apparent to the GWR chief mechanical engineer George Jackson Churchward that his Star Class 4-6-0 locomotives would soon be incapable of handling the heaviest West of England expresses without assistance. He therefore proposed fitting the  diameter boiler used on his 4700 Class 2-8-0 on to a 4-6-0 chassis, in 1919, to create a more powerful express locomotive, but was prevented from doing so by the weight restrictions on the GWR main line. The future problem was therefore left for his successor Charles Collett to solve.

On taking up office in 1922, Collett began to develop the more powerful Castle Class from Churchward's Star Class. However, the design was limited to a maximum axle-loading of  due to the weakness of some underline bridges. The new class would not therefore be able to pull express trains with more than thirteen coaches unaided. Following their introduction in 1923, the Castle Class was the most powerful express passenger class in the country in terms of tractive effort, but this honour was lost to the Southern Railway's Lord Nelson class in 1926.

The GWR's General Manager, Sir Felix Pole, was anxious for a new design that would once again enable the company to claim to run the most powerful locomotive. Pole agreed to allow Collett to explore a design for a "Super-Castle", subject to getting the tractive effort above . By 1927, a series of bridge renewals had taken place on the Great Western mainlines.

Design

Although Collett was nominally responsible for the design of the class, the detailed work was undertaken by his Chief draughtsman Frederick Hawksworth.

The smaller wheels also allowed for a wider boiler within the loading gauge to be used.

There were 171 x  fire tubes, and 16 x  flue tubes. As built, they had 96 ×  superheater tubes.

To accommodate larger inner cylinders the distinctive design of the leading bogie was adopted, with outside bearings on the fore wheel and inside bearings on the rear wheel.

Production
Twenty locomotives were ordered from the GWR Swindon Works in 1927 (Lot 243). The first locomotive No. 6000 King George V, appeared in June 1927. It was followed by five others (6001-6005) a month later. The remaining fourteen (6006-6019) appeared at almost weekly intervals between February and July 1928. A second batch of ten locomotives (6020-6029 Lot 267) appeared between May and August 1930.

No. 6007 King William III was written off after an accident near  on 15 January 1936, and was condemned on 5 March 1936. A replacement was built (Lot 309) which may have incorporated some parts from the damaged locomotive; it took the same number and name, and was added to stock on 24 March 1936.

Naming
It was originally intended that the class be named after notable cathedrals, but, following an invitation to feature a GWR locomotive in the Baltimore and Ohio Railroad's (B&O) centenary celebrations, the GWR decided to make them more notable by naming the class after British Kings.

Following the death of King George V in 1936, No. 6029 ‘King Stephen’ was renamed ‘King Edward VIII’ after his successor; and following the abdication of the latter in the same year, No. 6028 ‘King Henry II’ was renamed ‘King George VI’ after the new King.

Operations

The class proved to be successful and able to cope with the heaviest express trains at a higher-speed timetable average than the "Castle". Due to their size and weight, the King class was however restricted to the London-Taunton-Plymouth (via both Bristol and ) and the London-Birmingham-Wolverhampton (via Bicester) main lines. The class was therefore used on the GWR's crack expresses such as the Cornish Riviera Limited until the end of regular steam hauled express services on the Western Region of British Railways, although they needed assistance for the heaviest services over the South Devon Banks between Newton Abbot and Plymouth. They were unable to serve in Cornwall, due to the weakness of the Royal Albert Bridge, and so when they were hauling the Cornish Riviera Limited, they had to be swapped for a 'Castle' or 'Hall' at Devonport.

King George V in the United States
After six months of operation, No. 6000 was shipped to North America in August 1927 to join in Baltimore & Ohio Centenary celebrations, where its sleek appearance and smooth performance impressed all who witnessed it. King George V was presented with a brass bell and cabside medallions to mark the occasion.
The application of pressurised oil lubrication showed its advantages over the largely grease-lubricated American Locomotives, and was even incorporated into a later design for the B&O in 1928.

Further developments
No. 6014 was partially streamlined in March 1935 with a hemispherical smokebox door, continuous splashers, straight nameplate and a swept-back cab front. However, the appendages were soon removed, with the exception of the cab.

The class proved to be capable and reliable when using the high-calorific South Wales steam coal, on which the GWR had always relied for its good locomotive performance. However, during the 1948 locomotive exchanges, King Henry VI performed disappointingly using Yorkshire coal, despite demonstrating the 4-6-0 type's unique sure-footedness when climbing out of Kings Cross, where pacific types were apt to slip alarmingly.

However, in 1947 experiments were undertaken with a four-row high-degree superheater in No. 6022 King Edward III. As a result, the four-row superheaters were fitted to the whole class, and modifications were also made to the draughting arrangement, using No. 6001 King Edward VII as a test-bed. From September 1955, double blast-pipes and chimneys were fitted, initially to No. 6015 King Richard III. Following successful testing the whole of the class was subsequently modified and, as a result, their final years in British Railways ownership saw the very best of their performance, particularly on the steep South Devon Banks at Dainton, Rattery, and Hemerdon.

Accidents and incidents
On 10 August 1927, the leading bogie of, then new, 6003 King George IV, became derailed at speed approaching . This led to the suspension arrangement of the unusual bogie being improved.
There have been two serious accidents involving the class:
Due to errors by the guard of the freight train and a signalman, an express passenger train hauled by No. 6007 King William III ran into the six wagons that had been left behind and derailed. Two people were killed. As a result, the locomotive was written off and replaced by another with the same name and number.
Twenty-seven people were killed and 57 were seriously injured.

List of King Class locomotives
Thirty-one locomotives were built at Swindon, although only 30 were in service simultaneously:

Preservation 

As a result of its previous  broad-gauge system, the GWR had the largest loading gauge of all the pre-nationalisation railways in the UK. Consequently, this restricted them as to where they could operate under both GWR and British Railways ownership.

No. 6018 King Henry VI was the subject of preservation by Sir Billy Butlin, but the plans never came to fruition and the locomotive was scrapped. Famous film actor Kenneth More expressed a desire to save the locomotive, but those plans never came into fruition.

Developments in high-speed rail from the 1970s mean that ballast depths have increased, resulting in a present decrease in UK pan-network loading gauge height. This has recently started to be reversed with the introduction of pan-European loading gauge standards on some mainlines, mainly originating from ports.

All three preserved Kings have been on the mainline in preservation but only 6000 King George V and 6024 King Edward I have operated on the main line.

The National Railway Museum, owners of 6000 King George V, decided to keep this locomotive in its original condition.

Civic heraldry

The Borough of Swindon commissioned a new coat of arms when it became a unitary authority in 1997. The coat of arms includes an image of 6000 King George V on the shield, recognising the importance of the Swindon works in the development of Swindon. The coat of arms of the old Borough of Swindon (1900–74) included an image of GWR 3031 Class 3029 White Horse.

Audio files

References

Sources

External links 

 King Class introduction (Great Western Archive)
 No. 6000 King George V (National Railway Museum)
 No. 6023 King Edward II (Great Western Society)
 No. 6024 King Edward I (6024 Preservation Society)
 , contemporary account of the class

 
6000
4-6-0 locomotives
Railway locomotives introduced in 1927
Standard gauge steam locomotives of Great Britain
Articles containing video clips
2′C h4 locomotives
Passenger locomotives